Kevin 'Dambo' Ndayisenga (born 30 January 1995 in Bujumbura) is a Burundian professional footballer who operates as striker for Jomo Cosmos F.C.

Club career

In 2015, he was on the verge of signing for Simba S.C.

Vowing to assist Jomo Cosmos F.C. in their promotion objective just after his arrival, he is seen by some as a replacement for scorer Charlton Mashumba.

Returning to Burundi for a few months to resolve a work permit problem, he went back to South Africa, playing his first game fronting AmaZulu F.C. where he scored.
Severely injured for a month, Kevin was fully recovered by March 2017 and returned to play.

Personal life
For his delectation, Ndayisenga plays PlayStation and listens to music.

References

External links
 

Living people
1995 births
Burundian footballers
Burundi international footballers
Association football forwards
Atlético Olympic FC players
Jomo Cosmos F.C. players
National First Division players
Burundian expatriate footballers
Burundian expatriate sportspeople in South Africa
Expatriate soccer players in South Africa
Sportspeople from Bujumbura
21st-century Burundian people